Evânio Rodrigues da Silva (born 2 September 1984) is a Brazilian Paralympic powerlifter. He represented Brazil at the 2016 Summer Paralympics held in Rio de Janeiro, Brazil and he won the silver medal in the men's 88 kg event. He also competed at the 2020 Summer Paralympics held in Tokyo, Japan.

He won the gold medal in his event at both the 2015 Parapan American Games and 2019 Parapan American Games.

At the 2017 World Championships held in Mexico City, Mexico, he won the bronze medal in the men's 88 kg event.

In 2021, he competed in the men's 88 kg event at the 2020 Summer Paralympics held in Tokyo, Japan without a successful lift.

References

External links 

 

Living people
1984 births
Place of birth missing (living people)
Powerlifters at the 2016 Summer Paralympics
Powerlifters at the 2020 Summer Paralympics
Medalists at the 2016 Summer Paralympics
Paralympic silver medalists for Brazil
Paralympic medalists in powerlifting
Paralympic powerlifters of Brazil
Medalists at the 2015 Parapan American Games
Medalists at the 2019 Parapan American Games
Brazilian powerlifters
20th-century Brazilian people
21st-century Brazilian people